Aerial stem modifications are modifications to the aerial stems, vegetative buds and floral buds of plants growing in different conditions and which perform functions such as climbing, protection, support, synthesis of food, or vegetative propagation. Aerial stem structures that undergo modifications to perform these special functions include tendrils, thorns, hooks, phylloclade, tuberous stems and bulbils. The auxiliary or the terminal part of the modified structures show their stem nature.

Tendrils 

Some weak stemmed plants produce wiry, coiled, sensitive and delicate organs for climbing. They are called tendrils. These may develop from either the axillary bud or the terminal bud of the stem. In Passiflora, the tendrils develop from the axillary bud. In Cissus quadrangularis and in Vitis vinifera the terminal bud develops into tendrils.

Thorns 

These are hard, woody, pointed structures meant for protection. They are provided with vascular tissue, which may develop from the axillary bud or terminal buds. They control transpiration by reducing the vegetative growth.
In Bougainvillea, Punica granatum and Duranta the axillary bud develop into thorns. In Duranta, the thorns are provided with leaves and flowers. In Punica granatum, the thorns bear leaves and branches. In Carissa carandas the terminal bud produces a pair of thorns. They help in protection.

Bulbils 

When axillary bud becomes fleshy and rounded due to storage of food, it is called bulbil. It gets detached from the plant, falls on ground and develops into a new plant. e.g. Dioscorea. It is in axel (the space between leaf and stem)

Cladode 

These are green branches of limited growth (usually one internode long) which have taken up the functions of photosynthesis. True leaves are reduced to scales or spines, e.g. Asparagus.

References 

Botany